Shiloh Church may refer to:

Shiloh Church (Springdale, Arkansas), listed on the National Register of Historic Places (NRHP) in Washington County
Shiloh Meeting House and Cemetery, Ireland, Indiana, NRHP-listed in Dubois County
Shiloh Primitive Baptist Church, NRHP-listed in Johnston County, North Carolina, near Brogden, North Carolina
Shiloh Church (Newport, Rhode Island), NRHP-listed in Newport County
Shiloh Methodist Church, in Inman, South Carolina, NRHP-listed in Spartanburg County
Shiloh Church, a landmark in the Battle of Shiloh

See also
Shiloh Community Church in Manchester, New Hampshire
Shiloh Baptist Church (disambiguation)
Shiloh Temple, Lisbon Falls, Maine
Mount Shiloh Missionary Baptist Church, New Bern, North Carolina